Ehtisham Sultan (born 17 April 1998 in Mansehra, Khyber Pakhtunkhwa), is a Pakistani cricketer.

Domestic career
Sultan made his debut for Abbottabad Falcons against Rawalpindi Rams in the 2015 Super 8 Twenty20 Cup. He got a score of 0* and didn’t bowl as Rawalpindi won by 6 wickets. He played his next match against Peshawar Panthers in the 2015–16 National T20 Cup. He bowled for the first time in his career and got figures of 0/19 in 1 over. Abbottabad won the match by 6 wickets.

References

External Links
 
 Ehtisham Sultan at Pakistan Cricket Board
 Ehtisham Sultan at Cricket Archive

1998 births
Living people
Pakistani cricketers
Lahore Qalandars cricketers
Abbottabad cricketers